The Venture 22 is an American trailerable sailboat that was designed by Roger MacGregor as a cruiser and first built in 1968.

The Venture 22 and the similar MacGregor 22 were developed into the Venture 222 in 1971.

Production
The design was built by MacGregor Yacht Corporation in the United States, from 1968 until 1971, but it is now out of production.

Design
The Venture 22 is a recreational keelboat, built predominantly of fiberglass, with wood trim. It has a masthead sloop rig, a raked stem, a slightly angled transom, a transom-hung rudder controlled by a tiller and a retractable swing keel. The design is equipped with a "pop-top" to increase cabin headroom. It has positive foam flotation making it unsinkable. The boat displaces  and carries  of lead ballast,  of which is in the keel.

The boat is normally fitted with a small  outboard motor for docking and maneuvering.

The design has sleeping accommodation for five people, with a double "V"-berth in the bow cabin, drop-down dinette table that forms a small double berth on the starboard side of the main cabin and an aft quarter berth on the port side. The galley is located on the port side just aft of the bow cabin. The galley is equipped with a two-burner stove and a sink. The head is located in the bow cabin on the port side under the "V"-berth.

Operational history
In a 2010 review Steve Henkel wrote, "here is a vessel designed to satisfy the Great American public's desire for a simple, low cost sailboat big enough  to cruise a family of four (or five in a pinch), at least for a weekend. The hull walls are thin, the hardware is so-so, but the boat does not pretend to be a 'yacht' (despite the word 'yacht' in the name of the manufacturer), and the formula worked. As early as 1970 the company's ads said 'There are more Ventures sold than any other cruising sailboat. The price is low. The trailer is your mooring. And ... the wind is free.' Best features: Very shallow draft plus a low-slung trailer, sold with the boat, that makes launching and retrieving as easy as it gets. A fold-down poptop and button-on canvas weather curtains provide interior space with 6' 1" headroom when at anchor or when sailing in a light breeze. Foam flotation under the cockpit and the forward V-berth make the boat unsinkable despite the weight of her 460 pound swing keel. And we like the dinette, which converts to a so-called 'double' about 3' 4" wide and barely 6' long. Worst features: Did I mention cheap construction? Well you can't have everything."

See also
List of sailing boat types

References

Keelboats
1960s sailboat type designs
Sailing yachts
Trailer sailers
Sailboat type designs by Roger MacGregor
Sailboat types built by the MacGregor Yacht Corporation